Gaurav Ghei (born 25 September 1968) is an Indian professional golfer who plays on the Asian Tour. He turned professional in 1991. His wins include three Asian Tour titles: the 1995 Gadgil Western Masters, the 2006 Taiwan Masters, and the 2007 Beijing Open. In 1997 he became the first Indian golfer to qualify for The Open Championship.

Amateur wins
1991 East India Amateur, West India Amateur, North India Amateur

Professional wins (5)

Asian Tour wins (3)

Other wins (2)
1994 Desaru Classic (Malaysia)
1999 Asian Nations Cup (Malaysia; individual)

Results in major championships

Note: Ghei only played in The Open Championship.
CUT = missed the half-way cut

Team appearances
Dunhill Cup (representing India): 1996
World Cup (representing India): 1997, 2003, 2007

External links

Indian male golfers
Asian Tour golfers
Golfers from Delhi
1968 births
Living people